Myaukhpet Shinma of the 37 nats in the Burmese pantheon of nats. She is the nat representation of the wet nurse of King Tabinshwehti, and a native of North Kadu. She died in childbirth. She is portrayed on her knees, right hand on her bosom and left hand on her knee.

References

33
Burmese goddesses
Wet nurses